Agromyza pseudoreptans is a species of leaf miner flies in the family Agromyzidae. It has been known to feed on Urtica dioica and Urtica pilulifera both of which are nettles.

References

Agromyzidae
Articles created by Qbugbot
Insects described in 1967